Oksana Aleksandrovna Gozeva (born 30 December 1989 in Moscow) is a Russian former competitive figure skater. She represented Russia at the 2009 World Junior Championships and at the 2010 European Championships.

Programs

Competitive highlights
GP: Grand Prix; JGP: Junior Grand Prix

References

External links

 

Russian female single skaters
Figure skaters from Moscow
1989 births
Living people